A gamemaster (GM; also known as game master, game manager, game moderator, referee, or storyteller) is a person who acts as an organizer, officiant for regarding rules, arbitrator, and moderator for a multiplayer role-playing game. They are more common in co-operative games in which players work together than in competitive games in which players oppose each other. The act performed by a gamemaster is sometimes referred to as "Gamemastering" or simply "GM-ing".

The role of a gamemaster in a traditional table-top role-playing game (pencil-and-paper role-playing game) is to weave the other participants' player-character stories together, control the non-player aspects of the game, create environments in which the players can interact, and solve any player disputes. The basic role of the gamemaster is the same in almost all traditional role-playing games, although differing rule sets make the specific duties of the gamemaster unique to that system.

The role of a gamemaster in an online game is to enforce the game's rules and provide general customer service. Also, unlike gamemasters in traditional role-playing games, gamemasters for online games in some cases are paid employees.

In Dungeons & Dragons, gamemasters are called dungeon masters, and in the World of Darkness games, they are called storytellers.

History and variants of the term
The term gamemaster and the role associated with it could be found in the postal gaming hobby. In typical play-by-mail games, players control armies or civilizations and mail their chosen actions to the GM. The GM then mails the updated game state to all players on a regular basis. Usage in a wargaming context includes Guidon Games 1973 ruleset, Ironclad. 

In a role-playing game context, it was first used by Dave Arneson while developing his game Blackmoor in 1971, although the first usage in print may have been Chivalry & Sorcery. 

Each gaming system has its own name for the role of the gamemaster, such as "judge", "narrator", "referee", "director", or "storyteller", and these terms not only describe the role of the gamemaster in general but also help define how the game is intended to be run. For example, the Storyteller System used in White Wolf Game Studio's storytelling games calls its GM the "storyteller", while the rules- and setting-focused Marvel Super Heroes role-playing game calls its GM the "judge". The cartoon inspired role-playing game Toon calls its GM the "animator". A few games apply system- or setting-specific flavorful names to the GM, such as the Keeper of Arcane Lore (in Call of Cthulhu), the Hollyhock God (Nobilis, in which the hollyhock represents vanity), or the most famous of such terms, the "Dungeon Master" (or "DM") in Dungeons & Dragons.

In traditional table-top role-playing games

The gamemaster prepares the game session for the players and the characters they play (known as player characters or PCs), describes the events taking place and decides on the outcomes of players' decisions. The gamemaster also keeps track of non-player characters (NPCs) and random encounters, as well as of the general state of the game world. The game session (or "adventure") can be metaphorically described as a play, in which the players are the lead actors, and the GM provides the stage, the scenery, the basic plot on which the improvisational script is built, as well as all the bit parts and supporting characters. Gamemasters can also be in charge of RPG board games making the events and setting challenges.

GMs may choose to run a game based on a published game world, with the maps and history already in place; such game worlds often have pre-written adventures. Alternatively, the GM may build their own world and script their own adventures.

A good gamemaster draws the players into the adventure, making it enjoyable for everyone. Good gamemasters have quick minds, sharp wits, and rich imaginations. Gamemasters must also maintain game balance: hideously overpowered monsters or players are no fun. It was noted, in 1997, that those who favor their left-brain such as skilled code writers usually do not make it in the ethereal gamemaster world of storytelling and verse.

The four major "hats"
 Author: The GM plans out (in the loosest sense) the plot of the story of which the player characters will become heroes (or villains, or rich, etc.); creating (or adapting, or just choosing) the setting, populating that region with villains and other NPCs, and assigning them any necessary backgrounds, motivations, plans and resources.
 Director: During the game, while each of the other players typically controls the actions of one of the player characters, the GM decides the actions of all the NPCs as they are needed. The GM may also direct a particular "NPC" that travels with the party (commonly known as a GMPC), but this may occasionally be open to abuse since the Game Master having a "pet" NPC may compromise their neutrality.
 Referee: In most tabletop RPGs, the rules are supplied to resolve conflicting situations (avoiding the "Bang! you're dead!"/"No, you missed!" quandary). The GM is expected to provide any necessary interpretation of those rules in fuzzier situations. The GM may also approve or provide House Rules in order to cover these corner cases or provide a different gaming experience.
 Manager: The least officially prescribed portion of GMing, and thus the part that takes people the most by surprise. The GM is typically the one to organize the game in the first place, find players, schedule sessions, and figure out a place to play, as well as acting as a mediator and having to balance the needs and desires of all participants—sometimes having to divine the real desires of indecisive or inexperienced players.

In online games
In early virtual worlds gamemasters served as a moderator or administrator; in MUD game masters were called "wizards". Gamemastering in the form found in traditional role-playing games has also been used in a semi-automatic virtual worlds. However, human moderation was sometimes considered unfair or out of context in an otherwise automated world. As online games expanded, gamemaster duties expanded to include being a customer service representative for an online community. A gamemaster in such a game is either an experienced volunteer player or an employee of the game's publisher. They enforce the game's rules by banishing spammers, player killers, cheaters, and hackers and by solving players' problems by providing general customer service. For their tasks they use special tools and characters that allow them to do things like teleport to players, summon items, and browse logs that record players' activities. Often, players who feel dissatisfied with the game will blame the GMs directly for any errors or glitches. However, this blame is misdirected as most GMs are not developers and cannot resolve those types of problems.

The now defunct America Online Online Gaming Forum used to use volunteers selected by applications from its user base. These people were simply referred to as OGFs by other members, and their screennames were indicative of their position (i.e., OGF Moose, etc.). While membership in the Online Gaming Forum had only one real requirement (that is, be a member of AOL), OGFs were given powers quite similar to AOL "Guides" and could use them at will to discipline users as they saw appropriate.

World of Warcraft has employees of Blizzard Entertainment that serve as gamemasters to help users with various problems in gameplay, chat, and other things like account and billing issues. A gamemaster in this game will communicate with players through chat that has blue text and they will also have a special "GM" tag and Blizzard logo in front of their names.

RuneScape has more than 500 moderators employed by Jagex to assist players and perform administrative duties in-game and on the site forums. These Jagex Moderators, as they are called, usually have the word "Mod" and a gold crown preceding their account names which ordinary players are not permitted to use. The game also has Player Moderators and Forum Moderators who are player volunteers helping with moderation, having the ability to mute (block from chatting) other players who violate rules.

Battleground Europe, a medium-sized MMOFPS, has a team of Game Moderators, anonymous volunteers who moderate the game.

Miniconomy, a smaller text-based MMO, has a team of Federals, experienced players that help moderate the game and interactions.

Transformice, an online multiplayer platformer, has a team of volunteer moderators called Mods who are experienced players that help moderate the game and interactions.

ARMA 3, an open-world military tactical shooter, has a Zeus role that allows any player slotted in that role to place down almost any asset in the game including infantry and vehicles, objectives, intelligence, and score-keeping modules. The Zeus can also modify aspects of the world itself including time, weather, and wildlife to create dynamically progressing stories.

Note that a few games, notably Neverwinter Nights and Vampire: The Masquerade – Redemption, are video game adaptations of tabletop role-playing games that are played online with one player acting as a traditional gamemaster.

In pervasive games
Gamemastering, sometimes referred to as Orchestration is used in pervasive games to guide players along a trajectory desired by the game author. To ensure proper gamemastering can take place, four components are needed: some kind of sensory system to the game allowing the game masters to know current events, providing dynamic game information; dynamic and static game information lets game masters make informed decisions; decisions need to be actuated into the game, either through the game system or through manual intervention; and finally a communication structure is needed for both diegetic or non-diegetic communication. Effective gamemastering can require specialized user interfaces that are highly game specific.

Gamemasters in online chat environments
Sometimes, tabletop GMs simply can not find players interested in either the same setting, product line, or play style in their local neighborhood. The advent of the networked personal computer provided a solution in the form of online chat programs. Appropriately equipped gamemasters can find players online and a group can meet via chat rooms, forums, or other electronic means.

In contrast to standard tabletop procedure (and to games designed to be played online), this online chat format significantly changed the balance of duties for a prospective gamemaster. Descriptive text required more preparation, if only via cut-and-paste; acting and voice skills could not be utilized to get the personality of NPCs and monsters across, increasing the value of background music ('assigned' in advance or individually chosen) as a playing aid. The GM was likely to need copies of player-character records, being unable to glance at the originals as in normal face-to-face procedure. The format also forced the issue (particularly when participants were not personally acquainted) of whether to leave all rolling of dice to the GM (making one's own rolls is a privilege not readily surrendered by some players), or to trust all players to honestly report the results of their rolls (the honor system may be strained when it is in a player's best interest to roll well).

However, workarounds to these challenges have only increased over time. The use of Wiki software helps GMs and players alike keep track of all manner of game data, sometimes evolving into a home-made gaming supplement. Scripting software allows unwieldy mechanics (e.g. a complicated formula or repetitive die-rolling) to be resolved at the push of a button. Teleconferencing enhances group communication through voice, video, and a shared whiteboard. The use of technology to enable online play is growing, as reflected in products like the D&D Insider.

See also
 Dungeon Master

References

External links
 

Video game culture
Role-playing game terminology
Pervasive games
Nerd culture